Vallata is a town and comune in the province of Avellino, Campania, Italy.

Located in the Apennines between the Ufita Valley and Daunian Mountains, the town is part of the Roman Catholic Diocese of Ariano Irpino-Lacedonia. Its territory borders the municipalities of Bisaccia, Carife, Guardia Lombardi, Scampitella, and Trevico.

References

Cities and towns in Campania